The 2009–10 Croatian First Football League (officially known as the T-Com Prva HNL for sponsorship reasons) was the nineteenth season of the Croatian First Football League, the national championship for men's association football teams in Croatia, since its establishment in 1992. It began on 24 July 2009 and ended on 13 May 2010. Dinamo Zagreb were the defending champions, having won their eleventh championship title (and fourth consecutive title) the previous season, and they defended the title again, after a goalless draw with Hajduk Split on 1 May 2010.

The format was changed from previous season in that the league was expanded from 12 to 16 clubs.

Promotion and relegation from 2008–09 
Due to the expansion, no teams were directly relegated following the 2008–09 season.

Four teams from 2008–09 Druga HNL earned direct promotion. These were champions Istra 1961, runners-up Karlovac, third-placed Lokomotiva and fifth-placed Međimurje. Fourth-placed team Slavonac CO had to step back from promotion after they were not able to find a suitable ground.

Croatia Sesvete as last-placed team had to compete in a two-legged play-off against the sixth-placed team from Druga HNL, Hrvatski Dragovoljac. After a scoreless first leg, Croatia Sesvete retained their Prva HNL status by winning the second leg, 2–1.

Overview

Teams

Stadia and locations 
Since most Druga HNL stadiums failed to meet the licensing requirements for top-level football, the Croatian Football Federation announced on 8 May 2008 that clubs who are likely to win promotion berths have agreed to lease stadiums approved for top-flight football. Below is the list of all the stadiums which are licensed to be used in the Prva HNL, along with their home clubs and the promoted clubs who secured rights to use them as "guests" until their own grounds have sufficiently been upgraded to host top-level matches.

Managerial changes

League table

Results

Top goalscorers 
As of 13 May 2010; Source: HRnogomet.com

Transfers 
 List of Croatian football transfers summer 2009
 List of Croatian football transfers winter 2009–10

See also 
 2009–10 Croatian Football Cup
 2009–10 Croatian Second Football League

References

External links 
 Season statistics at HRNogomet
 Official website 
 Prva HNL at UEFA.com
 2009–10 in Croatian Football at Rec.Sport.Soccer Statistics Foundation

Croatian Football League seasons
Cro
Prva HNL